

Matches
Scores and results list England's points tally first.

Touring party

Manager: Geoff Cooke 
Coach: Roger Uttley 
Captain: Rob Andrew

Full back
Simon Hodgkinson (Nottingham)

Three-quarters
Rory Underwood (Leicester & RAF)
Jeremy Guscott (Bath)
Simon Halliday (Bath)
Chris Oti

Half-backs
Rob Andrew (Wasps)
Steve Bates (Wasps)

Forwards
Paul Rendall (Wasps)
Brian Moore (Nottingham)
Gareth Chilcott (Bath)
Wade Dooley (Fylde)
Paul Ackford (Harlequins)
Mike Teague (Gloucester)
Peter Winterbottom (Harlequins)
Dean Richards (Leicester)
Jeff Probyn (Wasps)
Gary Rees (Nottingham)

References

1989 rugby union tours
1989
1989
rugby union
1988–89 in English rugby union
1988–89 in European rugby union
Romania national rugby union team matches

it:Tour della Nazionale di rugby a 15 dell'Inghilterra 1989